The second Battle of Saint-Aubin du Cormier was a conflict between the anti-revolutionary Chouans and the French Republican forces during the Chouannerie. The First Battle of Saint-Aubin-du-Cormier took place in 1488.

A substantial force of 1,000 Chouans under Gustave Hay de Bonteville moved to meet the small Republican force of 500 men, encountering them close to Saint-Aubin-du-Cormier. The Republicans were taken by surprise, losing 90 men killed or injured to the loss of 2 Chouans and 12 injured.

References
Boutellier, La Révolution dans le Pays de Fougères, Société archéologique et historique de l'arrondissement de Fougères, 1989
Toussaint Du Breil de Pontbriand, Mémoire du colonel de Pontbriand, 1897

Battles involving France
1796 in France
Ille-et-Vilaine
Military history of Brittany